The following is a list of government agencies and operations affected by the 2018–2019 United States federal government shutdown.

Department of Homeland Security

Coast Guard
Military Coast Guard retirees will not receive an annuity if the shutdown extends past February 1.

Department of Commerce

United States Census Bureau
The Census Bureau still has funding remaining for the 2020 census, up until a maximum of eight weeks from the start of the year.

National Institute of Environmental Health Sciences
While most of the National Institutes of Health centers are unaffected by the shutdown, the National Institute of Environmental Health Sciences is affected.

National Park Service

Death Valley National Park 
Illegal camping and off-road driving have been reported as issues since the shutdown began.

Joshua Tree National Park 
Instances of people driving off-route, creating new roads into park land, vandalizing public property, and chopping down Joshua trees have been reported since the shutdown began.  The park has remained open during the shutdown.

Department of Justice

Federal Bureau of Prisons
In addition to corrections offices not getting paid, federal prisons do not have the funding to pay bills such as electric bills.

National Aeronautics and Space Administration
Only 4% of NASA employees remain working during the shutdown.  The Day of Remembrance set for January 31 was postponed until after the shutdown.

The White House
The White House staff has been reduced by about 75%.

Others
Other agencies were affected by the shutdown as follows: Transportation Security Administration, Federal Aviation Administration, Federal Bureau of Investigation, National Oceanic and Atmospheric Administration, National Science Foundation, Drug Enforcement Administration, Bureau of Alcohol, Tobacco, Firearms and Explosives, U.S. Customs and Border Protection, United States Forest Service, National Weather Service, United States Department of Commerce, United States Department of Housing and Urban Development, United States Department of Transportation, United States Department of the Treasury, United States Department of the Interior, United States Department of Homeland Security, United States Department of Agriculture, United States Department of Commerce and Centers for Disease Control and Prevention

References

Agencies affected by the United States federal government shutdown of 2018-2019
Government finances in the United States